Saint  (also Galaktion, Galaction) was a 3rd-century Syrian Christian, martyred with his wife, Episteme (Epistimi, Greek Επιστημη), whom he had converted to the Faith.

Life 
He was the son of Kletophon and Leukippe, who were a rich and distinguished, but initially childless, pagan couple. When the couple was converted after being evangelized by a travelling monk/priest/beggar on the promise that the one, true God would hear their prayers and grant them a child,  was conceived and born. 

 hoped from the beginning to live the monastic life, but he submitted in obedience to his parents and was betrothed to the beautiful pagan woman Episteme. During the course of their engagement, over subsequent visits  converted first his fiancée and then her servant, Eutolmius. The couple went away to the mountain of Publion:  to a men's monastery, and Episteme to an abbey. They did not leave their monasteries, and neither saw the other until their deaths. 

A fierce persecution arose, and both were brought to trial. When  was martyred under Emperor Decius at Emesa (now Homs, Syria) in 251 AD, Episteme went to his side and was killed with him. His feast day is November 5.

References

External links
Patron Saints Index article

3rd-century deaths
251 deaths
3rd-century Christian martyrs
Married couples
Year of birth unknown